Rouhollah Rahmani (born 10 September 1934) is an Iranian athlete. He competed in the men's triple jump at the 1960 Summer Olympics.

References

1934 births
Living people
Athletes (track and field) at the 1960 Summer Olympics
Iranian male triple jumpers
Olympic athletes of Iran
Place of birth missing (living people)